Zend Studio is a commercial, proprietary integrated development environment (IDE) for PHP developed by Zend Technologies, based on the PHP Development Tools (PDT) plugin  for the Eclipse platform (the PDT project is led by Zend).

Zend Studio is tightly integrated with Zend Server, Zend's pre-integrated, tested PHP application stack. The integration enables developers to quickly set up a complete PHP environment and speed up root cause analysis of problems detected in testing or in the production environment.

Zend Studio is also integrated with Laminas. For example, it provides an MVC view for easy code navigation and integration with Zend_Tool for automated code generation.

Along with Zend Server, in 2013 Zend Studio had been deployed at more than 40,000 companies.

Features
 Code folding
 Customized Framework Project Layout
 Zend Framework Zend_Tool Integration 
 Symfony 2 Framework support
 Model–view–controller View
 In-place Refactoring (smart rename)
 Visual Mobile Development support
 Code semantic analysis & quick fix 
 PHP 4 and PHP 5.X Support 
 Mark occurrences of language elements, exit paths and requires 
 Type hierarchy of classes and methods
 Dojo Toolkit support
 jsDoc support 
 PHP script debugging (Remote/local servers and Browser via FireFox plugin)
 Auto detection of a local Zend Server
 Servers View
 Zend Server events list
 Import and debug Zend Server events
 Easy project creation on Zend Server
 Quick on-server debug mechanism
 Zend Server API 
 Integrated PHPUnit
 Integration with phpDocumentor
 Atlassian connector support via Eclipse plugin (Jira, Bamboo, FishEye, Crucible)
 Git, Subversion, CVS, and Perforce (via Eclipse plugin) support
 Deployment with FTP, SFTP and FTP over SSH
 Database view for MySQL, Microsoft SQL Server, Oracle, PostgreSQL, SQLite and others 	 
 Project/File Browser
 Web services support
 Import Zend Studio 5.5 projects
 Remote Project Support

See also
 Zend Technologies
 Zend Server
 List of Eclipse-based software
 Eclipse
 Xdebug

References

External links
 

Integrated development environments
Linux integrated development environments
PHP

de:Zend Technologies#Zend Studio